Charles "Chuck" Joel Stone (July 13, 1936 – April 16, 2019) was an American statistician and mathematician.

Early life
Charles Joel Stone was born and raised in Los Angeles. After secondary school at North Hollywood High School, Stone  graduated with a Bachelor of Science in science from the California Institute of Technology in 1958. He then matriculated at Stanford University, where in 1961 he received his PhD in statistics. His PhD thesis Limit Theorems for Birth and Death Processes and Diffusion Processes was supervised by Samuel Karlin.

Career
From 1962 to 1964 Stone was an assistant professor in the mathematics department of Cornell University. From 1964 1981 to he was a faculty member of the mathematics department of UCLA (University of California, Los Angeles), where he worked extensively with Leo Breiman (who moved to Berkeley in 1980) and Sidney Charles Port (born 1935). In the statistics department of the University of California, Berkeley, Stone was from 1981 a full professor, a position which he held until his retirement as professor emeritus.

When they were professors at UCLA, Stone and Breiman consulted for Technology Services Corporation in Santa Monica. Based on their work, they co-authored a 1978 technical report, Parsimonious Binary Classification Trees, Elaborating on the report, in 1984 they published, with two more co-authors, Jerome H. Friedman and Richard Allen Oshlen (born 1942), a greatly expended version entitled Classification and Regression Trees.

In addition to research on statistical algorithms, Stone did research on potential theory, "local limit theorems, weak convergence of stochastic processes, and renewal theory."

Stone was the advisor for 14 doctoral students, including Probal Chaudhuri, Mark Henry Hansen, and James Stephen "Steve" Marron. Stone was a Guggenheim Fellow for the academic year 1980–1981. In 1986 he was an invited speaker at the International Congress of Mathematicians in Berkeley, California. He was elected a Fellow of the Institute of Mathematical Statistics in 1970  and a Fellow of the Class of 2013 (announced in 2012) of the American Mathematical Society.
He was elected a Member of the National Academy of Sciences in 1993.

Personal life
In June 1966 he married Barbara L. Sohn in Los Angeles. They had two sons.

Death
Stone died on April 16, 2019.

Selected publications

Articles
 
 
 
 
 
 
 
 
 
  (over 2300 citations)

Books
  (textbook)
  (textbook)
   (textbook)

References

1936 births
2019 deaths
American statisticians
20th-century American mathematicians
21st-century American mathematicians
People from Los Angeles
Fellows of the American Mathematical Society
Members of the United States National Academy of Sciences
North Hollywood High School alumni
Massachusetts Institute of Technology alumni
Stanford University alumni
University of California, Los Angeles faculty
University of California, Berkeley College of Letters and Science faculty
Cornell University faculty
Mathematical statisticians